A Tot Jazz/2 is an album by pianist Tete Montoliu recorded in 1965 and originally released on the Spanish label, Concentric.

Reception

Ken Dryden of AllMusic stated: "This is another excellent date by the blind Catalonian pianist."

Track listing
 "Chim Chim Cher-ee" (Richard M. Sherman, Robert B. Sherman) – 5:50
 "Polka Dots and Moonbeams" (Jimmy Van Heusen, Johnny Burke) – 4:12	
 "Secret Love" (Sammy Fain, Paul Francis Webster ) – 7:12	
 "Salt Peanuts" (Dizzy Gillespie, Kenny Clarke) – 3:17	
 "Israel" (John Carisi) – 4:38
 "Sometime Ago" (Sergio Mihanovich) – 5:42
 "Come Rain or Come Shine" (Harold Arlen, Johnny Mercer) – 5:19
 "Have You Met Miss Jones?" (Richard Rodgers, Lorenz Hart) – 3:07

Personnel
Tete Montoliu – piano
Erik Peter – bass 
Billy Brooks – drums

References

Tete Montoliu albums
1965 albums